Alqueva is a former civil parish in the municipality of Portel, Portugal. The population in 2011 was 329, in an area of 79.20 km2. On 28 January 2013, the parish merged with Amieira to form the new parish of Amieira e Alqueva.

Population

References

Former parishes of Portel, Portugal